Gayathri Reddy (born 14 July 1995) is a former Indian actress and model. She is well known for opposing actor Vijay in the film Bigil in 2019.

Career 
Gayathri made her film debut in Bigil (2019) in which she played Maari, one of the female soccer players. She had never played football before and took part in a forty-five day bootcamp to improve her football skills. Regarding her role in the film, she stated that, "It was quite difficult to work with Vijay sir initially because there were scenes where I had to look him in the eye and who resentment". She played a role in the Tamil-language film Lift.

In 2022, Gayathri officially announced via her YouTube channel that after her marriage she will quit cinema and stop acting and modeling permanently.

Personal life
On 28 September 2022, Gayathri married a businessman. The marriage was an arranged marriage. After her marriage she migrated to Australia for good.

Filmography

Television

References

External links 

Female models from Chennai
Actresses from Chennai
Living people
Actresses in Tamil cinema
Indian film actresses
21st-century Indian actresses
1995 births